The Fountain Inn is a grade II listed pub at 53 Westgate Street, Gloucester, England. It is mentioned in an Abbey Rental document of 1455. Some of the building is from the late 16th century but it was mostly rebuilt in the late 17th century, altered in the 18th century, and remodelled around 1900.

References

External links 

Grade II listed pubs in Gloucestershire
Pubs in Gloucester
Westgate, Gloucester
Pubs in Gloucestershire